RCRD can refer to:

RCRD LBL, an MP3 download website
Rainy City Roller Dolls, a roller derby league from Centralia, Washington
Rat City Roller Derby, a roller derby league from Seattle, Washington
Richter City Roller Derby, a roller derby league from Wellington, New Zealand
Roc City Roller Derby, a roller derby league from Rochester, New York